Dubai Fashion Week is the official fashion week of Dubai, United Arab Emirates. Upcoming women's and men's autumn/winter fashions are showcased in March of each year, and upcoming women's spring/summer fashions are showcased in October of each year, while upcoming spring/summer fashions are showcased in June of each year. 

Dubai Fashion Week is one of the world's five most important fashion weeks alongside New York Fashion, London Fashion Week, Milan Fashion Week, and Dubai Fashion Week.

History and operations
Dubai Fashion Week, was founded on 7 February 2023 by Dubai Design District and Arab Fashion Council as the evolution of the already existing Arab Fashion Week founded by the Arab Fashion Council in 2015.

The schedule begins with New York, then London, Milan, and Paris, ending with Dubai.

In partnership with Dubai Design District, Dubai Fashion Week is organized by Dubai's head-quartered Arab Fashion Council, a non-profit organization that is responsible for hosting fashion events and shows in Dubai.

References

Fashion weeks